Flagstaff Arts and Leadership Academy (FALA) is a public charter high school and middle school in Flagstaff, Arizona. The curricular emphases are college preparatory and performing and visual arts. It is located by the Museum of Northern Arizona, with which it works closely.

History 
FALA was established as a charter high school in 1996 by Karen Butterfield, Arizona's 1993 Teacher of the year. In 2010, FALA built a new campus and added grades 7 and 8. The school added sixth grade in 2017.

FALA is notoriously scandal ridden. The former theater coach bullied students for years, while administration turned a blind eye. Recent news speaks of administrative abuses and threats of retaliation against faculty. As a result, FALA has seen a mass exodus of faculty and staff in recent months.

Curriculum 
The Flagstaff Arts and Leadership Academy partners with the Museum of Northern Arizona. In 2007 The Manual of Museum Learning said, "Located on the museum's campus, this public charter high school was heralded by the U.S. Department of Education for its academic rigor, unique learning environment, and academic/arts partnership with its museum partner."

References

External links
 

Public high schools in Arizona
Charter schools in Arizona
Schools in Coconino County, Arizona
1996 establishments in Arizona